Wasserberg is a mountain in the Swabian Jura in the German state of Baden-Württemberg.

Mountains under 1000 metres
Mountains and hills of Baden-Württemberg
Mountains and hills of the Swabian Jura